Germany is scheduled to compete at the  2018 Winter Paralympics in Pyeongchang, South Korea.

Medalists

Alpine skiing 

For the super combined event, the first run is the super-G and the second run is the slalom.

Men

Women

Biathlon 

Men

Women

Cross-country skiing 

Men

Women

Relay

Wheelchair curling 

Round-robin standings

Round-robin
Germany has a bye in draws 2, 4, 6, 9, 14 and 16.

Draw 1
10 March 2018, 14:35

Draw 3
11 March 2018, 9:35

Draw 5
11 March 2018, 19:35

Draw 7
12 March 2018, 14:35

Draw 8
12 March 2018, 19:35

Draw 10
13 March 2018, 14:35

Draw 11
13 March 2018, 19:35

Draw 12
14 March 2018, 9:35

Draw 13
14 March 2018, 14:35

Draw 15
15 March 2018, 9:35

Draw 17
15 March 2018, 19:35

References 

Nations at the 2018 Winter Paralympics
2018
Paralympics